Vila do Porto is a civil parish in the municipality of Vila do Porto, located on the island of Santa Maria, in the Portuguese autonomous region of Azores. It is the southernmost and easternmost parish in the archipelago of Azores. The population in 2011 was 3,119, in an area of 25.55 km².

History

 
Following its discovery by Diogo Silves, Friar Gonçalo Velho Cabral noble in the House of Henry the Navigator, commander in the Order of Christ, arrived at Santa Maria in 1432, then referred to as the Ilha dos Lobos (island of wolves), referring to the wolf seals found in the region at the time. It was the seat of the first captaincy of the islands of the Azores (that included Santa Maria and São Miguel. Its settlement began in 1439, after the original beachhead in Praia dos Lobos (in the north of the island). A regal charter from Infante Peter (regent of King Afonso V), dated 2 July 1439, indicated that Henry had ordered that sheep should be deposited on the seven islands of the Azores. São Miguel and Santa Maria were the first islands to be settled by families from Estremadura, Alto Alentejo and Algarve, through the initiative of Gonçalo Velho, then the designated first Captain-donatário of the Azores.

The settlement of the southerly villa of Porto occurred in 1450, by Fernão de Quental, on a hilltop overlooking the southern coast over a wide cove. The parish was founded with a foral (charter) issued in 1470.

Life in this community was isolated, inaccessible and poorly defensible. Many of the early documents associated with its founding were lost in a pirate attack occurring in 1616. Consequently, at the beginning of the 17th century, the Fort of São Brás, on the site of Cimo da Rocha was likely constructed, alongside the hermitage dedicated to Nossa Senhora da Conceição.

Referring to the population, Gaspar Frutuoso (the humanist and chronicler) indicated:
"This town is populated and the whole island, of honorable people, and many of their progeny have been knighted, and others through wedding alliances with the Captains and their sons, who were born noble. All the honorable men, natives of this land, are generally high in stature, well disposed and proportioned, of good and serious faces and happy faces, presumptuosos [sic] and honorable friends, as is expected of honorable men."

In the 20th century (1901), Vila do Porto received a regal visit from King Carlos I and Queen Amélia. In 1908, still during the monarchy, the Republican Party elected their first member to the municipal council.

Following the construction of the international airport in 1944, primarily to serve as an emergency US airbase, in 1946 civil air traffic was inaugurated resulting in the development of a dynamic urban, economic and social culture in the archipelago. The institutionalization of air service resulted in the Portuguese establishment of a permanent presence, with the construction of the barrio of Aeroporto by architect Keil do Amaral becoming a result of this activity.

On 21 October 1992, the urbanized area of Vila do Porto, that included the historic town, was classified under Regional Legislative Decree 22/92/A, as an area of public interest. This was supported by a similar decree on 24 August 2004 (29/2004/2), to establish a jurisdictional regime to protect and recover some of the cultural patrimony (under article 58, line 3) that included the historic town.

Geography

It is located along the western coast of the island, limited by the Atlantic Ocean to the north, west and south and the parishes of Almagreira and São Pedro in the east.

Not to be confused with the municipality of Vila do Porto, the oldest settlement in the Azores, is a semi-urban parish that includes two principal areas: a zone south of the parochial Church, that conforms to the medieval roads and village, and a modern area developed along new roadways to the north and eastern plain (that incorporates the barrio of Aeroporto and Vila) divided by two river-valleys (the São Francisco and Sancho). In addition there are various localities in the region, including Salvaterra, Valverde, Pedras de São Pedro, Flor da Rosa, Santana, and Anjos.

Economy
While the parish's past was marked by agriculture, its modern economy concentrated on the secondary and tertiary markets, resulting from its importance as a hub of trans-Atlantic air traffic and commerce.

Architecture

Civic
 Airport Barrio
 Ceramic Factory of Santa Maria
 Formigas Lighthouse
 Monument to Christopher Columbus
 Primary School and Cantina of Vila do Porto
 Residence of Father Manuel
 Residence of the 3rd Captain-Donatário
 Residence Rua Teófilo Braga, 124
 Section Barracks and Fiscal Guard Post
 Shingle Kiln in Santo Antão
 Social Security Building

Military
 Fort of São Brás, situated at the southern edge of the town, the fort was part of a defensive line that dates back to the 15th century;

Religious
 Church of Nossa Senhora da Assunção
 Church of Santo Antão
 Church of the Misericórdia
 Convent of São Francisco
 Hermitage of Nossa Senhora dos Anjos
 Hermitage of Nossa Senhora da Boa Viagem
 Hermitage of Nossa Senhora da Conceição da Rocha
 Hermitage of São Pedro Gonçalves Telmo

References
Notes

References
 
  
  
 
  
 

Freguesias of Vila do Porto